Charles Brodrick Bernard  (died 31 January 1890) was an Irish Anglican bishop.

Bernard was the younger son of James Bernard, 2nd Earl of Bandon, by Mary Susan Albinia Brodrick, daughter of the Right Reverend Charles Brodrick, Archbishop of Cashel. Francis Bernard, 3rd Earl of Bandon, was his elder brother. He was educated at Balliol College, Oxford, and  appointed the 56th Bishop of Tuam,  55th Bishop of Killala and 56th of Achonry in 1867. He died in post on 31 January 1890.

Bernard married the Honourable Jane Grace Dorothea Evans-Freke, daughter of Percy Evans-Freke, in 1843. He was the great-grandfather of Percy Bernard, 5th Earl of Bandon.

References

Year of birth unknown
1890 deaths
Alumni of Balliol College, Oxford
19th-century Anglican bishops in Ireland
Bishops of Tuam, Killala, and Achonry
Younger sons of earls